The Strange Possession of Mrs. Oliver is a 1977 American made-for-television horror film directed by Gordon Hessler and starring Karen Black, George Hamilton, Robert F. Lyons, Lucille Benson, and Jean Allison.  The teleplay was written by Richard Matheson. The film first aired on NBC in 1977.

Plot

Its plot follows a bored housewife who takes on an alternate persona that starts wreaking havoc on her life. Karen Black plays the title role, a dowdy, downtrodden housewife plagued by recurring nightmares of funerals, black flowers, fires, and a woman called Sandy. Seeking an escape from her stifling lifestyle and dull husband, who only wishes her to have a baby, Black dons a low-cut red blouse, blonde wig, garish makeup, and a new identity. She is also compelled to buy a house in a beach community where it would appear a woman who looks just like her once resided - before her tragic demise.

It turns out that the woman Black pretends to be may actually exist—and may have more than a passing knowledge of the occult.

Critical Reception

According to John Stanley, "Director Gordon Hessler builds the mystery with a deft camera, creating ambiguities to intrigue us: Is Black undergoing possession, reincarnation or what? Supernatural mood blends with psychological thrills."

Cast

Critical response
Hal Erickson of AllMovie awarded the film four out of five stars, but noted that Hessler's direction "muddles" Matheson's "perfectly coherent script."

References

External links

1977 horror films
1977 television films
1977 films
American supernatural horror films
Films about spirit possession
Films directed by Gordon Hessler
Films with screenplays by Richard Matheson
1970s American films